The  Viola Beiroa is a stringed musical instrument from Castelo Branco, Eastern Portugal. It has 12 strings in 7 courses. The strings are made of steel. It is tuned D3, D3, A3 A2, D3 D2, G3 G2, B3 B3, D3 D3. The scale length is about 520mm.

External links
 The Stringed Instrument Database
 ATLAS of Plucked Instruments

String instruments
Portuguese musical instruments

pt:Violas portuguesas#Viola beiroa